Oberlin is the surname of:

 Frank Oberlin (1876–1952), American Major League Baseball pitcher
 J. F. Oberlin (1740–1826), Alsatian pastor and philanthropist
 Jérémie Jacques Oberlin (1735–1806), Alsatian philologist and archaeologist, brother of the above
 Russell Oberlin (1928–2016), American opera singer
 Rachel Oberlin (born 1986), American former pornographic actress
 Urs Oberlin (1919–2008), Swiss writer and poet